Bahri Tanrıkulu (born March 16, 1980 in Ankara, Turkey) is a Turkish taekwondo practitioner, who competed in the Men's 80 kg division at the 2004 Summer Olympics held in Athens, Greece and won the silver medal. He studied at Akdeniz University.

He is Turkey's first World and European Taekwondo champion. He was a member of Istanbul Metropolitan Municipality Sports Club before he transferred to Kocaeli Büyükşehir Belediyesi Kağıt Spor Kulübü.

He qualified for participation at the 2012 Summer Olympics where he reached the semi final.

Personal life
Bahri is the eldest of four siblings in a family originating from Diyarbakır. His brothers Tunç and Çağrı, as well as his sister Azize perform taekwondo. While Tunç retired from active sports, Azize and Çağrı are still competing. Azize Tanrıkulu took also part at the Beijing Olympics winning the silver medal.

Bahri Tanrıkulu married Tina Morgan (born 1982), an Australian taekwondo athlete on January 29, 2009 in Perth, Australia.

Achievements
 1998 12th European Taekwondo Championships in Eindhoven, Netherlands -  (Featherweight)
  1998 1st Spanish Open Taekwondo Championships in Barcelona -  (juniors),  (seniors)
 1999 14th World Seniors Taekwondo Championships in Edmonton, Alberta, Canada - 
 2000 13th European Seniors Taekwondo Championships in Patras, Greece -  (Heavyweight male)
 2000 Korean Chuncheon International Open Taekwondo Championships - 
 2001 15th World Taekwondo Championships in Jeju, South Korea - 
 2002 14th European Taekwondo Championships in Samsun, Turkey -  (Middleweight)
 2002 Taekwondo World Cup in Tokyo, Japan - 
 2004 Summer Olympics in Athens, Greece -  (80 kg)
 2005 23rd World Universiade in İzmir, Turkey - 
 2006 European Seniors Taekwondo Championships in Bonn, Germany -   (- 84 kg)
 2007 Beijing - Bahri Tanrikulu of Turkey became the world champion in men's 84 kg category at the World Taekwondo Championships in Beijing. Tanrikulu defeated his Azerbaijani opponent Tavakgul Bayramov 4-0 and won gold medal. Bahri Tanrikulu beat Volodymyr Krasitsky of Ukraine in the first round, Rajabov Shokirjont of Tajikistan in the second round, Yossef Karami of Iran in the third round, Wu Ming-chieh of Taiwan in the quarter final, and Park Min-Soo of South Korea in the semi final.
 2008 European Seniors Taekwondo Championships in Rome -   
 2009 Taekwondo World Championships in Copenhagen -

References

External links
 

1980 births
Living people
Sportspeople from Ankara
Turkish male taekwondo practitioners
Olympic silver medalists for Turkey
Olympic taekwondo practitioners of Turkey
Taekwondo practitioners at the 2004 Summer Olympics
Taekwondo practitioners at the 2008 Summer Olympics
Olympic medalists in taekwondo
Akdeniz University alumni
Kocaeli Büyükşehir Belediyesi Kağıt Spor athletes
Taekwondo practitioners at the 2012 Summer Olympics
Istanbul Büyükşehir Belediyespor athletes
Medalists at the 2004 Summer Olympics
Universiade medalists in taekwondo
Universiade gold medalists for Turkey
European Taekwondo Championships medalists
World Taekwondo Championships medalists
Medalists at the 2005 Summer Universiade
20th-century Turkish people
21st-century Turkish people